The Monument to the Revolution is a landmark and monument commemorating the Mexican Revolution.  It is located in the Plaza de la República, near to the heart of the major thoroughfares Paseo de la Reforma and  Avenida de los Insurgentes in downtown Mexico City.

History

The building was initially planned as the Palacio Legislativo Federal (Federal Legislative Palace) during the regime of president Porfirio Díaz and "was intended as the unequaled monument to Porfirian glory."  The building would hold the congressional chambers of the deputies and senators, but the project was not finished due to the Mexican Revolutionary War. Twenty-five years later, the structure was converted into a monument to the Mexican Revolution by Mexican architect Carlos Obregón Santacilia. The monument is considered the tallest triumphal arch in the world, standing  in height. Porfirio Díaz appointed a French architect, Émile Bénard to design and construct the palace, a neoclassical design with "characteristic touches of the French renaissance," showing government officials' aim to demonstrate Mexico's rightful place as an advanced nation.  Díaz laid the first stone in 1910 during the centennial celebrations of Independence, when Díaz also inaugurated the Monument to Mexican Independence ("The Angel of Independence"). The internal structure was made of iron, and rather than using local Mexican materials in the stone façade, the design called for Italian marble and Norwegian granite.

Although the Díaz regime was ousted in May 1911, President Francisco I. Madero continued the project until his murder in 1913. After Madero's death, the project was cancelled and abandoned for more than twenty years. The structure remained unfinished until 1938, being completed during the presidency of Lázaro Cárdenas.

The Mexican architect Carlos Obregón Santacilia proposed converting the abandoned structure into a monument to the heroes of the Mexican Revolution. After this was approved, the structure began its eclectic Art Deco and Mexican socialist realism conversion, building over the existing cupola structure of the Palacio Legislativo Federal (Federal Legislative Palace). Mexican sculptor Oliverio Martínez designed four stone sculpture groups for the monument, with Francisco Zúñiga as one of his assistants.

The structure also functions as a mausoleum for the heroes of the Mexican Revolution of 1910, Francisco I. Madero, Francisco "Pancho" Villa, Venustiano Carranza, Plutarco Elías Calles, and  Lázaro Cárdenas. Revolutionary general Emiliano Zapata is not buried in the monument, but rather in Cuautla, Morelos. The Zapata family has resisted the Mexican government's efforts to relocate Zapata's remains to the monument.

References

External links 
 
 

Art Deco architecture in Mexico
Cuauhtémoc, Mexico City
Mexican Revolution
Monuments and memorials in Mexico City
Paseo de la Reforma